is an interchange passenger railway station located in the city of Ebina, Kanagawa, Japan. It is jointly operated by the East Japan Railway Company (JR East), and the private railway operators Odakyu Electric Railway, and Sagami Railway (Sōtetsu).

Lines
Ebina Station is served by the following lines.
Odakyu Odawara Line
Sagami Line
Sōtetsu Main Line

Station layout

Sōtetsu
The Sōtetsu Main Line station has a bay platform, serving two tracks.

JR East
The JR Sagami Line station has a single island platform, serving two tracks. The station has a Midori no Madoguchi staffed ticket office.

Odakyu
The Odakyu Odawara Line station has two island platforms serving four tracks.

History
The Odakyu Line , which had been in operation since 1927, was shifted 400 meters on 1 April 1943, for joint operation of Ebina Station. From December 1971, Ebina became one of the chief rail yards of the Odakyu line. From 21 March 1987, the Sagami Line began operations to Ebina, less than a month before the dissolution and privatization of the Japanese National Railways and formation of the East Japan Railway Company.

Station numbering was introduced to the Odakyu Line in January 2014 with Ebina being assigned station number OH32.

The Odakyu Ebina Station has a unique platform jingle that plays when trains are arriving. The melody is from the song Sakura by the Japanese pop band, Ikimonogakari (いきものがかり). The Odawara bound platforms 1 and 2 play the intro to the song while the Shinjuku / Chiyoda Line bound platforms 3 and 4 play a short portion from the middle of the song. On 19 April 2021 the Romance Car Museum opened beside the west exit to the station.

Passenger statistics
In fiscal 2019, the JR portion of the station was used by an average of 14,307 passengers daily (boarding passengers only). During the same period, the Odakyu station was used by an average of 152,370 passengers daily (total) and the Sotetsu portion of the station by 123,214 passengers (total).

The passenger figures (boarding passengers only) for previous years are as shown below.

See also
List of railway stations in Japan

References

External links

Ebina Station (Odakyu) 
Ebina Station (JR East) 
Ebina Station (Sagami Railway) 

Railway stations in Japan opened in 1941
Odakyu Odawara Line
Stations of Odakyu Electric Railway
Sagami Railway Main Line
Stations of Sagami Railway
Railway stations in Kanagawa Prefecture
Sagami Line
Ebina, Kanagawa